This article documents notable and expected spaceflight events during the year 2023.

Overview

Exploration of the Solar System 

NASA plans to launch the Psyche spacecraft, an orbiter mission that will explore the origin of planetary cores by studying the metallic asteroid 16 Psyche, in October 2023 on a Falcon Heavy launch vehicle.

In April, the European Space Agency (ESA) plans to launch the Jupiter Icy Moons Explorer (JUICE) spacecraft, which will explore Jupiter and its large ice-covered moons following an eight-year transit.

The OSIRIS-REx mission will return to Earth on 24 September with samples collected from asteroid Bennu.

Human spaceflight

Space tourism 
SpaceX plans to fly Polaris Dawn in July, a Crew Dragon mission including the first commercial spacewalk.

Rocket innovation 

The maiden flights of Arianespace's Ariane 6, Blue Origin's New Glenn, SpaceX's Starship, Relativity Space's Terran 1, and United Launch Alliance's Vulcan Centaur are planned for 2023, along with other smaller rockets.

On January 10, ABL Space Systems' RS1 had its debut flight, but failed to reach orbit.

On March 7, JAXA/MHI H3's maiden flight was terminated in-flight due to failure to ignite the second stage, resulting in the loss of the ALOS-3 land observation satellite.

Space debris and satellites management
On 27 January, ESA reported the successful demonstration of a breaking sail-based satellite deorbiter, which could be used by space debris mitigation measures.

Orbital launches

Deep-space rendezvous

Extravehicular activities (EVAs)

Space debris events

Orbital launch statistics

By country 
For the purposes of this section, the yearly tally of orbital launches by country assigns each flight to the country of origin of the rocket, not to the launch services provider or the spaceport. As an example, Electron launches from Mahia in New Zealand are counted under USA.

By rocket

By family

By type

By configuration

By spaceport

By orbit

Suborbital launch statistics

By country 
For the purposes of this section, the yearly tally of suborbital launches by country assigns each flight to the country of origin of the rocket, not to the launch services provider or the spaceport. Flights intended to fly below  are omitted.

Planned maiden flights
 Ariane 6 – Arianespace – Europe (ESA) – late 2023
 Gravity-1 – Orienspace – China – Q4 2023
 Kairos – Space One – Japan – Summer 2023
 Long March 6C – CASC – China – TBD
 New Glenn – Blue Origin – U.S. – late 2023
RFA One – Rocket Factory Augsburg – Germany – late 2023
 Starship – SpaceX – U.S. – March
 Terran 1 – Relativity Space – U.S. – March 22, 2023
 Vulcan Centaur – United Launch Alliance – U.S. – Q2

Notes

References

External links

 
Spaceflight by year
2023-related lists